The Women's Freestyle 53 kg competition of the wrestling events at the 2022 Mediterranean Games in Oran, Algeria, was held from 28 June to 29 June at the EMEC Hall.

Results
 Legend
 F — Won by fall

References

Women's Freestyle 53 kg
2022 in women's sport wrestling